Melissa Ferrick (born September 21, 1970) is an American singer-songwriter. Their song "Drive" (2000) is considered a lesbian anthem. They are a music professor at Northeastern University and at Berklee College of Music.

Early life
Ferrick was raised in Ipswich, Massachusetts.  Their father John was a public school teacher who managed several free-jazz bands on the side.  As a child, Ferrick would often accompany their father to clubs on Boston's North Shore to watch the bands play. They began taking classical violin lessons at the age of five, and then moved on to the piano. In elementary and junior high school, they learned the trumpet and bass. Altogether, they received 15 years of formal music training, including two years at Berklee College of Music. They dropped out to pursue a music career.

Career

Ferrick began their career singing and playing in coffeehouses in the East Village, New York City. They received a great deal of publicity in 1991 when they replaced, at the last minute, the opening act for the singer Morrissey on tour. They were subsequently signed to a recording contract with Atlantic Records and released their first two albums, Massive Blur, in 1993 and Willing to Wait, in 1995.

In 1996, they—in their words–"bottomed out" on alcohol. After sobering up, they returned to music, signing with the indie label What Are Records?. Ferrick released three albums on the label; Made of Honor, Everything I Need, and Freedom, the latter inspired by Janet Jackson's The Velvet Rope. Their 1998 album Everything I Need was nominated for Album of the Year by the Gay & Lesbian American Music Awards (GLAMA).

In 2000, Ferrick founded their own record label, Right On Records. The first studio album released on their own label was Skinnier Faster Live at the B.P.C..

In the Eyes of Strangers, released in October 2006, was the sixth album released on Right On Records.  Ferrick partially financed the recording costs with song sales via their website. Their fourteenth album, Goodbye Youth, was released September 2008. In Spring 2010, they released an album of cover songs called Enough About Me. In 2011, she released the album Still Right Here featuring original songs.

During live performances, Ferrick mostly self-accompanies on a Collings OM3 SB acoustic guitar. They have also experimented with loop pedals and a range of accompaniments, including, in particular, brass instruments.

Ferrick's rigorous touring schedule generally includes more than 150 shows per year. They play solo gigs in small to medium-sized clubs and numerous festivals, as well as larger venues accompanied by a band.  In 2007, they performed at the Michigan Womyn's Music Festival, and opened for Ani Difranco. Their song "Drive" from the Freedom album became popularly known as a "lesbian anthem".

Their musical inspirations include Bruce Springsteen, The Pretenders, Rickie Lee Jones, Paul Simon, Earth Wind and Fire, Tori Amos, Radiohead, Dave Matthews, and Joan Armatrading.

Personal life
Melissa Ferrick identifies as queer and gender-nonconforming.

Ferrick uses she/they pronouns.

Discography
 1993 – Massive Blur
 1995 – Willing to Wait
 1996 – Made of Honor
 1997 – Melissa Ferrick +1 (live)
 1998 – Everything I Need
 2000 – Freedom
 2001 – Skinnier, Faster, Live at the B.P.C. (live)
 2001 – Valentine Heartache
 2002 – Listen Hard
 2003 – 70 People at 7000 Feet (live)
 2004 – The Other Side
 2006 – In the Eyes of Strangers
 2006 – Decade (video)
 2007 – Live at Union Hall (live)
 2008 – Goodbye Youth
 2010 – Enough About Me
 2011 – Still Right Here
 2013 – The Truth Is
 2015 – Melissa Ferrick

References

External links

Melissa Ferrick interview on The Lesbian Podcast 

Living people
1970 births
American singer-songwriters
American folk singers
People from Ipswich, Massachusetts
Berklee College of Music alumni
Lesbian singers
Lesbian songwriters
American lesbian musicians
American LGBT singers
American LGBT songwriters
LGBT people from Massachusetts
Singer-songwriters from Massachusetts
Guitarists from Massachusetts
Harvard Graduate School of Education alumni
Queer singers
Queer songwriters
20th-century American guitarists
21st-century American guitarists
20th-century American singers
21st-century American singers
20th-century American LGBT people
21st-century American LGBT people
Non-binary singers
Non-binary songwriters
American non-binary writers